U.S. Army Test and Evaluation Command, or ATEC, is a direct reporting unit of the United States Army responsible for developmental testing, independent operational testing, independent evaluations, assessments, and experiments of Army equipment.

ATEC is located throughout the continental United States and Hawaii. Command headquarters is located at Aberdeen Proving Ground, Maryland.

History 
Consolidation of all Army developmental and operational testing commands was approved by the Vice Chief of Staff of the Army on 18 Nov. 1998. The decision led to the redesignation of the Operational Test and Evaluation Command to ATEC on 1 Oct. 1999. All major subordinate commands of OPTEC were redesignated as well with the Test and Evaluation command redesignated as the U.S. Army Developmental Test Command, Aberdeen Proving Ground; the Test and Experimentation Command was redesignated the U.S. Army Operational Test Command, Fort Hood, Texas; and the Operational Evaluation Command and the Evaluation Analysis Center were combined to form the new U.S. Army Evaluation Center located at Aberdeen Proving Ground.

Operations 
ATEC conducts testing for all branches of the military and maintains a large customer base that includes the National Security Agency, Joint Chiefs of Staff, allied foreign countries, and Congress. ATEC employs approximately 9,000 military, civilian and contract employees that are highly skilled test officers, engineers, scientists, technicians, researchers, and evaluators. ATEC is involved in more than 1,100 tests daily that encompass everything from individual weapons to National Missile Defense systems. The annual budget for the command is in excess of half a billion dollars.

Test centers 

Aberdeen Proving Ground (APG)
Army Evaluation Center (AEC)
Aberdeen Test Center (ATC)
Joint Test Element (JTE)
Dugway Proving Ground (DPG)
West Desert Test Center (WDTC)
Redstone Test Center (RTC)
White Sands Missile Range (WSMR)
White Sands Test Center (WSTC)
Yuma Proving Ground (YPG)
Yuma Test Center (YTC)
Tropic Regions Test Center (TRTC)
Cold Region Test Center (CRTC)

Operational Test Command (OTC) locations:
Fort Hood:
OTC headquarters
Aviation Test Directorate
Maneuver Test Directorate
Maneuver Support and Sustainment Test Directorate
Mission Command Test Directorate
Fort Bragg: Airborne and Special Operations Test Directorate
Fort Bliss: Air Defense Artillery Test Directorate
Fort Sill: Fires Test Directorate
Fort Huachuca: Intelligence Electronic Warfare Test Directorate

See also
Operational Test and Evaluation Force
Director, Operational Test and Evaluation
Joint Interoperability Test Command
Air Force Operational Test and Evaluation Center
Air Force Test Center
Naval Air Warfare Center
Naval Undersea Warfare Center
Marine Corps Operational Test and Evaluation Activity
Marine Corps Test Unit

References

Further reading 
ATEC News
ATEC Civilian Careers

United States Army Direct Reporting Units
Military in Maryland
1999 establishments in the United States